The Spokane Public Library is a public library system serving the city of Spokane, Washington, US. It has five branches and a central library in downtown Spokane, along with a bookmobile and online services. The library system was acquired by the municipal government in 1894 and is funded by the city budget and a separate property tax.

History

The Spokane Public Library was established in 1894, after two unsuccessful attempts at creating a library system in the city. The system was acquired by the city from the Union Library Association, a partnership between the Sorosis Club and Carpenters Union, who had started the private library in 1891. The library rented space inside the city hall's basement, with a permanent location sought with funding from philanthropist Andrew Carnegie. The three-story Carnegie Library opened in 1904 at the western edge of downtown. The library system established three branches, also built with funds from Carnegie, in the early 1910s. The downtown library was replaced in 1963 with a branch in the Comstock Building, a former Sears Roebuck department store.

A bond issue passed by voters in 1990 enabled the library system to replace all four of its locations, including the Comstock branch. The current five-branch system and downtown library were all completed by 1998. In 2013, voters approved a property tax to partially fund library services, alongside allocated funds from the city budget. It was renewed by a referendum in 2017.

Branches
The Spokane Public Library system has six total locations, including branches established in the early 20th century. All of the branches were replaced with new libraries in the 1990s.

The Downtown Branch is located at the corner of Lincoln Street and Main Avenue, near the River Park Square shopping mall. It opened in January 1994 to replace the Comstock Library. The library is planned to close in February 2020 for a two-year renovation and will be replaced by a temporary branch inside the STA Plaza bus station.
The East Side Branch is located in the East Central neighborhood, near Liberty Park. It opened in December 1995.
The Hillyard Branch is located in the Hillyard neighborhood near Empire Avenue and Cook Street. It opened in January 1994.
The Indian Trail Branch is located in northwestern Spokane, near Indian Trail Road. It opened in March 1998.
The Shadle Branch is located in Shadle Park on Wellesley Avenue. It opened in 1997.
The South Hill Branch is located in the Comstock neighborhood on South Perry Street. It opened in January 1996.

Former Libraries
Main (Carnegie Library) - 10 South Cedar
North Monroe Branch - 925 West Montgomery Street
Heath Branch - 525 Mission Street
East Side Branch - 25 Altamont Street
Hillyard Library - 2936 E Olympic Ave

References

Public libraries in Washington (state)
Spokane, Washington
1894 establishments in Washington (state)